Sir Thomas Hildebrand Preston, 6th Baronet, OBE (2 June 1886 – 30 December 1976) was a British diplomat and 6th Baronet of Beeston St Lawrence, Norfolk. He was awarded the Order of the British Empire in 1934.

Life

Thomas Hildebrand Preston was born in Epping, Essex, the son of William Thomas Preston and Alice Mary Stevens. He emigrated to New Zealand with his father who started farming at Timaru, and then was educated at Westminster School and undertook Russian studies at Trinity Hall, Cambridge. He later studied at the Ecole des Sciences Politiques, Paris, and the University of Munich. Preston lost an eye due to a school cricket injury and wore a monocle over his good eye.

Career

Around 1910, he joined the British Diplomatic Service. On 23 May 1913, he was appointed British Vice-Consul in Ekaterinburg in Russia. On 29 July 1916, he was appointed his government's consul for Perm, the West Siberian government in Tobolsk and the Akmolinsk Territory – still with his official residence in Ekaterinburg. When this city was evacuated on 13 July 1919 in the course of the Russian Civil War, Preston also left. In October 1919, he was transferred to Vladivostok to perform intelligence duties. On 30 October 1919, he was appointed as the new consul there. He was then employed for a time in the Overseas Trade Department of the British Foreign Office in London.

On 4 August 1922, Preston was assigned to the British Trade Mission then posted to Moscow. After the conclusion of the same, he was appointed as the new British Consul in Petrograd/Leningrad in November 1922. Following the temporary severance of his homeland's diplomatic relations with the Soviet Union in 1927, he left on 3 June 1927, being transferred instead to the post of consul in Turin, which he held from 23 September 1927 to 3 July 1929.

During World War II

On 31 July 1929 (taking up duty on 7 December 1929), Preston took up the post of British Consul to the Lithuanian government in Kaunas, which he retained for ten years. In this position he was promoted to Secretary 2nd Class on 10 February 1930, Secretary 1st Class on 17 July 1935 and Counsellor in the Diplomatic Service on 1 December. He was appointed Officer of the Order of the British Empire (O.B.E.) in 1934. On 12 June 1940, he was promoted to Envoy Extraordinary and Minister Plenipotentiary.

In this position, he provided 800 Jews with legal travel certificates, a few hundred of which were able to cross the Baltic Sea to neutral Sweden. He also assisted an additional four hundred Lithuanian Jews to escape to Mandatory Palestine in 1940 by issuing them illegal Palestine certificates, thus enabling them to leave for the Middle East via Turkey. This was irregular, as it greatly exceeded the number approved by the British government for immigrants to Palestine. Preston's efforts were recognized in 2017 with the British Hero of the Holocaust medal and in 2018 in the British Embassy Vilnius exhibition "Building Bridges", and in 2022 at the Kaunas Holocaust Memorial Day.

In 1940,  Preston was placed on The Black Book (G.B. special wanted list), a list of 2820 persons who were to be arrested automatically and as a priority by special units of the SS in the event of a German occupation of the country.

In September 1940, he was transferred to Istanbul on the occasion of the dissolution of his previous post in connection with the military developments of the time. From 18 June 1941 to 1948, he held the post of Counsellor in the Diplomatic Service at the British Embassy in Cairo. He retired in 1948.

Later life

He married Ella Henrietta von Shickandantz on 3 October 1913. He studied harmony, counterpoint and orchestration under noted Russian musicians. In 1937 he wrote White Roses, a ballet in one act, that was performed at the Kaunas State Theatre, as well as a piano score for a second ballet, The Dwarf Grenadier. In 1958, Preston composed a ceremonial march originally meant to accompany visitors to NATO headquarters at the Palais de Chaillot, Paris.

Before his appointment to Lithuania, Preston had worked as a gold prospector in the Ural Mountains. He wrote the book Before the Curtain (1950). He succeeded as the 6th Baronet Preston, of Beeston St Lawrence, Norfolk on 7 December 1963.

Preston's papers are held at the University of Leeds Special Collections.

References 

1886 births
1976 deaths
20th-century British diplomats
Alumni of Trinity Hall, Cambridge
Sciences Po alumni
Officers of the Order of the British Empire
Baronets in the Baronetage of the United Kingdom